Shinee World II (promoted as SHINee CONCERT "SHINee WORLD II") is the second concert tour by South Korean boy group, Shinee. The tour, travelling to different cities across Asia, began in Seoul on July 21, 2012.

History

Seoul
On July 21 and 22, 2012, Shinee held their second concert at Olympic Gymnastics Arena and performed in front of 20,000 fans. Shinee stated:

Taiwan
Shinee held concerts in Taiwan for two days, on September 15 and 16. The group performed in the Taipei Arena in front of 18,000 fans.

Hong Kong
Shinee held a concert at AsiaWorld–Arena in Hong Kong on October 27 with 10,000 fans. The local media such as Oriental Daily, Apple Daily and i-cable attended the press conference before the concert.

Singapore
On December 8, Shinee held a concert at the Singapore Indoor Stadium. The fans prepared a fan project in the form of birthday cakes for the members Minho and Onew, who celebrated their birthdays in December.

Album
On April 2, 2014, SM Entertainment released the live album to the concert, which includes two CD's with recordings from Shinee's concert in Seoul.

Set list

Schedule

References

External links
SM Entertainment – Official website
Shinee – Official South Korean website

Shinee concert tours
2012 concert tours